GNU Solfege is an ear training program written in Python intended to help musicians improve their skills and knowledge. It is free software and part of the GNU Project.

GNU Solfege is available for Linux, Windows, and OS X.

Exercises

 Recognize melodic and harmonic intervals
 Compare interval sizes
 Sing the intervals the computer asks for
 Identify chords
 Sing chords
 Sing tone from chords: root, third, fifth, etc.
 Scales
 Dictation
 Rhythm dictation
 Remembering rhythmic patterns
 Theory: name intervals and scales
 Cadences
 Intonation
 Identify harmonic progressions

This software was made in such way that it is possible for the user to customize the existing exercises or create new ones.

See also
 Ear training
 Music theory
 Solfège

References

External links
 
 Fedora 16 documentation

Free software
Free software programmed in Python
Solfege
Musical training software
Ear training